Diviciacus or Divitiacus was a druid of the Aedui tribe who lived in Gaul during the 1st century BC, the only druid from antiquity whose existence is attested by name. The name may mean "avenger".

His date of birth is not known, but he was an adult during the late 60s BC, at which time he was described by Julius Caesar as a "senator" of the Aedui. In Caesar's The Gallic War, the word "senator" is used to refer to Gallic aristocrats who took part in their clans' decision-making. Diviciacus supported the Aedui's pre-existing alliance with Rome.

Visit to Rome
In 63 BC, Diviciacus survived the Battle of Magetobriga, where forces of the Sequani and Arverni, together with Germanic troops under the Suebi king Ariovistus, massacred the Aedui. Thereafter, the Aedui became tributary to the Sequani. Following the Aedui defeat, Diviciacus traveled to Rome and spoke before the Roman Senate to ask for military aid. While there he was a guest of Cicero, who wrote of his knowledge of divination, astronomy and natural philosophy, and names him as a druid. Julius Caesar, who knew him well, noted Diviciacus' particular skills as a diplomat without calling him a druid.

Alliance with Caesar
Following Caesar's victory over the Helvetii, Diviciacus was a prominent member of the Gallic delegation to Caesar, and was appointed as their chief spokesman. He brought the Gallic people's concerns to Caesar regarding Ariovistus, who had taken the lives and liberty of the Aedui, yet he also drew attention to the fact that the lands of the Sequani (ancient enemies of the Aedui) were also being hijacked by Ariovistus. The Gauls' request provided the catalyst for the next phase of Caesar's Conquest of Gaul, when Caesar went on to confront and defeat Ariovistus.

Diviciacus had a brother, Dumnorix, who was aggressively anti-Roman. Throughout the Gallic Wars Dumnorix was able to actively sabotage Caesar's conquests many times thanks to his powerful position among the Aedui. Caesar asserts that Dumnorix conspired to take all of Gaul through his influence with the Helvetii, through the cunning statesman Orgetorix, and the Sequani.  After defeating him in battle, Caesar spared his life so as to avoid antagonizing Diviciacus, who had begged Caesar not to punish his brother. Later, however, Dumnorix attempted to escape from Caesar's control and was killed in the attempt.

Social positions
Delamarre contends that, in addition to holding the religious office of druid, Diviciacus may have been the Uergobretos, the annually elected political leader or chief magistrate of the Aedui, one of the most powerful nations in Gaul. If true, his combination of military and religious office responsibilities in Aedua paralleled Caesar's duties among the Romans (in Rome, Caesar was Pontifex Maximus in addition to being a magistrate and general). Diviciacus would have been Uergobretos sometime before 52 BC, when the election was contested between Convictolitavis and Cotos. The date of Diviciacus' death is not known; Cicero speaks of him in the past tense in 44 BC.

Popular culture
Diviciacus appears as a special Druid unit in the 2003 video game Praetorians, part of which is set during the Gallic Wars. In the game, Diviciacus serves as a healer, frequently appearing on the side of Rome during the campaign. His name is spelled "Divitiacus".

The lyrics to the Eluveitie song "(Do)minion" are written from the point of view of Diviciacus, addressed to his brother Dumnorix.

References

Bibliography
 
 Cicero, De Divinatione 1.41
 
 Julius Caesar, Commentarii de Bello Gallico 1.3, 1.16-20, 1.31-32, 2.5, 2.14-15, 6.12, 7.39

Gaulish rulers
Druids
1st-century BC rulers in Europe
Ambassadors to ancient Rome
Aedui
Celts